Tom Wright (born in Sydney, New South Wales) was  an Australian rugby league footballer who played for North Sydney in the New South Wales Rugby League premiership competition. Wright was captain-coach for Norths during the 1931 season.

References

Footnotes
 

Year of birth missing
Year of death missing
Australian rugby league coaches
Australian rugby league players
City New South Wales rugby league team players
North Sydney Bears captains
North Sydney Bears coaches
North Sydney Bears players
Rugby league players from Sydney